Canaan was the ancient Biblical region of the Levant. It is also a Semitic personal name or surname used by Arabic and Hebrew-speaking people.

Canaan may also refer to:

Places

Canada 
Rural Municipality of Canaan No. 225, Saskatchewan
Canaan, New Brunswick
Canaan River, New Brunswick
Canaan, Kings County, Nova Scotia
Canaan, Lunenburg County, Nova Scotia
Canaan, Yarmouth County, Nova Scotia

United States 
Canaan, Connecticut, a town
Canaan (CDP), Connecticut, a village in the town of North Canaan
Canaan, Indiana
Canaan, Maine
Canaan, Mississippi
Canaan, New Hampshire, a New England town
Canaan (CDP), New Hampshire, the main village in the town
Canaan, New York
Canaan, Pennsylvania
Canaan, Vermont, a New England town
Canaan (CDP), Vermont, a village in the town
Canaan, West Virginia
Canaan Township, Athens County, Ohio
Canaan Township, Madison County, Ohio
Canaan Township, Morrow County, Ohio
Canaan Township, Wayne County, Ohio
Canaan Valley, West Virginia
Canaan Valley Resort State Park
Canaan Valley National Wildlife Refuge (CVNWR)
New Canaan, Connecticut
North Canaan, Connecticut
Canaan (village), Connecticut
South Canaan Township, Wayne County, Pennsylvania
Canaan Township (disambiguation)

West Indies 
Canaan, Trinidad, a town in Trinidad and Tobago
Canaan, Tobago
Canaan, United States Virgin Islands

Other places 
Canaan, Khuzestan, Iran
Canaan, Haiti
Colinas de Canaan, a neighborhood in Santo Domingo, Dominican Republic

People 
Tawfiq Canaan (1882–1964), Palestinian physician and researcher of popular heritage
Isaiah Canaan (born 1991), American basketball player
Islam Cana'an (born 1983), Palestinian-Israeli footballer
K'naan (born 1978), Canadian-Somalian hip-hop artist
Canaan Banana (1936–2003), first President of Zimbabwe
Lydia Canaan, Lebanese singer-songwriter, humanitarian, and activist
Tony Kanaan (born 1974), Brazilian race car driver
Canaan (son of Ham), son of Ham and grandson of Noah in the Old Testament

Video games
Canaan, a location in Final Fantasy III, a role-playing video game
Canaan, a character in the Xenosaga video game series
The Mystical Land of Canaan, a location of great power and home of the Summon Spirit Origin in Tales of Xillia 2

Other uses
Canaan (TV series), a 2009 action/adventure anime based on the 428: Shibuya Scramble video game
Canaan Creative, a computer hardware manufacturer making bitcoin miners
Canaan Dog, the national dog breed of Israel
Canaan Records, a Christian record label
"Land of Canaan", a song on Indigo Girls' eponymous 1989 album
The Settlers of Canaan, a multiplayer board game

See also
Canaanism
Canaan, Trinidad and Tobago (disambiguation)